Vatutin is a Russian masculine surname, its feminine counterpart is Vatutina. Notable people with the surname include:

Alexey Vatutin (born 1992), Russian tennis player
Nikolai Vatutin (1901–1944), Soviet military commander

Russian-language surnames